Hlinná is a municipality and village in Litoměřice District in the Ústí nad Labem Region of the Czech Republic. It has about 300 inhabitants.

Administrative parts
Villages of Kundratice, Lbín and Tlučeň are administrative parts of Hlinná.

References

Villages in Litoměřice District